The twelfth season of American Dad! debuted on TBS October 20, 2014, and ended June 1, 2015, consisting of 15 episodes. This was its first season to air on the cable channel since moving from its former home on Fox. The season premiere was given a two-day preview ahead of its linear debut, being uploaded to YouTube and Facebook on October 13, 2014.

Guest voice actors for the show's 12th season include Kathy Bates, Kristin Chenoweth, Ted Danson, Will Forte, Stephen Fry, Josh Groban, Stan Lee, Kate Mulgrew, Dean Norris, Carl Reiner, Mickey Rooney in his final television appearance, Sinbad, Mark Spitz, Patrick Stewart, Uma Thurman, and Robert Wuhl.


Production
American Dad!s 11th season was the last to be produced for Fox prior its cancellation. In July 2013, TBS announced it had picked up the series for a 12th season. TBS had aired reruns of American Dad! in syndication during its run on Fox. Series co-creator and showrunner Mike Barker said about show's upcoming network relocation, "It's going to be the same American Dad!, just in a different place." However, Barker departed the series over creative differences once early production for season 12 commenced in November 2013.

Episode list

Notes

References

2014 American television seasons
2015 American television seasons
American Dad! (season 12) episodes